Cara Black and Els Callens were the defending champions and successfully defended their title, by defeating Anabel Medina Garrigues and Dinara Safina 3–6, 6–4, 6–4 in the final.

Seeds

Draw

Draw

References
 Main and Qualifying Rounds

2005 Doubles
Proximus Diamond Games
Proximus Diamond Games